
The  or "Royal Register" was the official and quasisecret Portuguese master map during the Age of Exploration, used as a template for the maps of all official Portuguese expeditions. It formed the complete record of Portuguese discoveries both public and secret. First compiled under Henry the Navigator, it was later held and expanded by the Casa da Índia ("India House") in the Ribeira Palace in Lisbon, Portugal. It was hung from the ceiling of the Casa da Índia's Division of Maps, protected from foreign and commercial spies but sometimes available to the era's scientific elite and copied for navigators in royal service. 

The Spanish were also obliged to share a copy of their master map under the terms of the 1529 Treaty of Zaragoza as part of establishing the line of demarcation between the two empires east of the Spice Islands (now Indonesia's Maluku Islands). 

The original Padrão Real has been lost, although the Cantino planisphere copy still exists. It is thought to have been made by a Portuguese cartographer sometime between December 1501 and October 1502. Cantino presumably bribed the cartographer to produce it and then sent the map to the Duke of Ferrara, probably on 19 November 1502. It is now held by the Biblioteca Estense in Modena, Italy.

Notes

References

Citations

Bibliography
 Note on the Castiglioni Planisphere, Armando Cortesão, Imago Mundi, Vol. 11, 1954 (1954), pp. 53–55
 Harvey, Miles The Island of Lost Maps: A True Story of Cartographic Crime. New York:Random House, 2000. . (Also ).

16th-century maps and globes
Portuguese Empire
Maritime history of Portugal
Portuguese exploration in the Age of Discovery